Mostafa Ahmadi is an Iranian football midfielder who plays for Sanat Naft in the Iran Pro League.

Club career
After spending most of his career years with Tabrizi sides, Ahmadi joined Siah Jamegan in summer 2015. He made his debut for Siah Jamegan on July 30, 2015 against Esteghlal as a starter.

Club career statistics

References

External links
 Mostafa Ahmadi at IranLeague.ir

1988 births
Living people
Iranian footballers
Association football midfielders
Shahrdari Tabriz players
Siah Jamegan players
Sanat Naft Abadan F.C. players
People from Baneh